The 2007-2008 Djurgårdens IF Hockey season began on September 25, 2007, with a match against defending champions Modo Hockey. After failing to qualify for the playo-offs for two seasons, Djurgårdens finished 7th and played silver medalist Linköpings HC in the quarter-final, but lost 1-4 in matches. Goaltender Daniel Larsson won the Honken Trophy as best goaltender and was named "Rookie of the Year".

Standings

Game log

Roster

References 

2007-08
2007–08 in Swedish ice hockey